The 1983 Avon Cup was a women's tennis tournament played on outdoor clay courts in Marco Island, Florida in the United States that was part of the 1983 Virginia Slims World Championship Series. It was the inaugural edition of the tournament and was held from January 22 through January 30, 1983. First-seeded Andrea Jaeger won the singles title.

Finals

Singles

 Andrea Jaeger defeated  Hana Mandlíková 6–1, 6–3
 It was Jaeger's 1st singles title of the year and the 10th of her career.

Doubles

 Andrea Jaeger /  Mary Lou Piatek defeated  Rosemary Casals /  Wendy Turnbull 6–3, 6–3
 It was Jaeger's 2nd title of the year and the 11th of her career. It was Piatek's only title of the year and the 1st of her career.

References

External links
 ITF tournament edition details

 
Avon Cup
Avon Cup